Route 58 is a highway in western Missouri.  Its eastern terminus is at U.S. Route 50 west of Warrensburg; its western terminus is at Route D west of Belton, Missouri.  It is one of only a very few highways to end at a state supplemental route.

Route 58 is one of the original 1922 state highways.  Its eastern terminus was at Route 13 in Warrensburg, and its western terminus was at Route 1 (now Route 291) north of Harrisonville.  In the 1950s, Route 58 had a spur connecting it with north US 71.

Major intersections

Related route

Route 58 Spur is a  road that extends from Route 58 west to Main Street in Centerview.

References

058
Raymore, Missouri
Transportation in Cass County, Missouri
Transportation in Johnson County, Missouri